What Doesn't Kill Us is the second studio album by the Indie band What Made Milwaukee Famous released by Barsuk Records on March 4, 2008. The title alludes to the Nietzsche quote.

Track listing
"Blood, Sweat & Fears" – 4:01
"Sultan" – 2:46
"Cheap Wine" – 3:21
"The Right Place" – 2:00
"For the Birds" – 3:41
"Self-Destruct" – 3:43
"Resistance St." – 3:52
"Prevailing Wind" – 2:32
"And the Grief Goes On..." – 3:27
"To Each His Own" – 3:05
"Middle of the Night" – 2:40
"The Other Side" – 2:23

Personnel
 Michael Kingcaid – guitar, vocals, keys
 Drew Patrizi – keyboard, vocals, guitar
 John Houston Farmer – bass
 Jeremy Bruch – drums, Percussion
 Jason Davis – guitars, vocals, bass

Guest Musicians
Steve Bernal – Cello
David Chenu – Baritone, Tenor Saxophone
Kim Deschamps – Pedal Steel
Michael Hoffer – Trumpet, Trombone 
Chris Michaels – Guitar, Keys
Pink Nasty – Vocals
Eric Roach – Mandolin

All songs by Kingcaid except: "For the Birds" lyrics by Kingcaid, music by Farmer, Kingcaid, Patrizi, Bruch, Davis; "Resistance St." lyrics by Kingcaid, music by Kingcaid, Farmer, Patrizi, Bruch, Davis; "And The Grief Goes On..." lyrics by Kingcaid, music by Farmer, Kingcaid, Patrizi, Bruch; and "Middle of the Night" by Patrizi.

Horn arrangements for "Sultan" by Hoffer, and for "Resistance St." by Hoffer & Kingcaid. String Arrangements for "Cheap Wine" and Self-Destruct" by Bernal.

Recorded and Mixed at Cacophony Recorders in Austin, TX

Produced by Chris Michaels 
Recorded by Erik Wofford 
Mixed by Erik Wofford & Chris Michaels 
Mastered by Jeff Lipton at Peerless Mastering in Boston, MA 
Quality Control Engineer: Maria Rice

Packaging Design and artwork by Christian Helms at The Decoder Ring in Austin, TX

2008 albums
What Made Milwaukee Famous (band) albums
Barsuk Records albums